An amiri decree is a decree made by an emir or his representatives (Arabic: المرسوم الأميري), generally in Bahrain, Kuwait, Qatar and the United Arab Emirates.   

See for example: 

 Amiri Decree Law No. 13 of 1984 (Bahrain), establishing a High Counsel for Labour Services
 Amiri Decree No. 11/1999 (Qatar) forming a Constitution Drafting Committee
 Amiri Decree No. 3 of 1988 as amended by the Amiri Decree No. 3 of 1996 (Ajman, UAE) creating and granting autonomous status to the Ajman Free Zone

References 

Law of Bahrain
Law of the United Arab Emirates
Constitutions of the United Arab Emirates
Sharia
Law of Qatar
Law of Kuwait
Decrees